The Dhedh are a menial worker and weaving caste of India. Historically, other Hindu communities considered them to be an untouchable group, outside the Hindu ritual ranking system known as varna. This community too observes untouchability in relationships with other low-status castes. The community are sometimes referred to as Patels.

In the 1930s-40s, many depressed classes and communities were active in trying to change their caste name and elevate their social status to that of Rajput. These included the Khalpa, who wanted to be known as Rohit, and the  Bhangi's desire to be known as Rishi, as well as the Vankar claim to Mahyavanshi status. Of these, only the Mahyavanshi claim was successful in gaining official recognition from the British Raj administration. This success was limited to a part of the community in South Gujarat.

See also
Makanji Kuber Makwana

References

Dalit communities
Scheduled Castes of Haryana
Scheduled Castes of Delhi
Scheduled Castes of Gujarat
Scheduled Castes of Rajasthan
Scheduled Castes of Madhya Pradesh
Scheduled Castes of Chhattisgarh
Weaving communities of South Asia